Arboledas is a town in Buenos Aires Province, Argentina, located 42 km south-east from the city of Daireaux. Its population is less than 600 inhabitants. The town was settled mainly by Volga Germans and other European immigrants.

Populated places in Buenos Aires Province
German communities
Volga German diaspora
Daireaux Partido